Westminster Schools of Augusta was founded in 1972 as a private, Christian, college-preparatory school located in the western section of Augusta, Georgia, United States. It serves students in grades pre-kindergarten through 12. The school is divided into three age groups, lower (pre-K to grade five), middle (grades six to eight), and upper (grades nine to 12).

The school consists of two main areas on its  campus. The original houses with the newest building, Knox Hall, which was opened in 2017, house grades six through 12. Pamplin Hall, constructed in 1999, houses pre-kindergarten through grade five.

Academics
Westminster's college-preparatory curriculum includes 19 Advanced Placement courses.

Athletics
Westminster Schools of Augusta fields 16 varsity interscholastic sport teams, including football, basketball, soccer, tennis, track and field, cross country, baseball, golf, swimming, and cheerleading.

The Westminster boys' soccer team is one of the most dominant in its state classification, having won five state championships. They have also won 12 regional championships. The girls' soccer team has won 12 regional championships. In the 2008-2009 season, the girls' soccer team won the state championship, the first in school history.

Westminster State Championships

 Class AAA: 2000-2001 Boys' Soccer State Champions
 Class AAA: 2001-2002 Boys' Soccer State Champions
 Class AAA: 2004-2005 Boys' Soccer State Champions
 Class AAA: 2006-2007 Boys' Soccer State Champions 
 Class AAA: 2006-2007 Boys' Tennis State Champions 
 Class AAA: 2008-2009 Girls' Soccer State Champions
 Class AAA: 2011-2012 Girls' Soccer State Champions
 Class AAA: 2012-2013 Cheerleading State Champions
 Class AAA: 2013-2014 Boys' Soccer State Champions

Notable alumni

References

External links
Westminster Schools of Augusta

Private schools in Richmond County, Georgia
Educational institutions established in 1972
Private high schools in Georgia (U.S. state)
Private middle schools in Georgia (U.S. state)
Private elementary schools in Georgia (U.S. state)
Preparatory schools in Georgia (U.S. state)